Lakhoshk may refer to:
 Lakhoshk, Chaharmahal and Bakhtiari